Lucius Julius may refer to:

 Lucius Julius Iullus (consul)
 Lucius Julius Libo, Roman consul
 Lucius Julius Caesar (disambiguation)
 Lucius Julius Ursus Servianus, Roman consul
 Lucius Julius Gainius Fabius Agrippa